Christopher Keith Lampard (December 20, 1945 – August 30, 2020) was a professional baseball player. 

Born in Warrington, Cheshire, England, to English parents, Lampard and his family emigrated to Oregon when he was three years old. He grew up in Portland, where he played Little League baseball, and attended the University of Oregon. Lampard played in the 1958 Little League World Series, alongside fellow future major-leaguer, Rick Wise.

In his 1969 audition, in which he mostly served as a pinch hitter, Lampard collected three hits in 12 at bats — the biggest of which was a walk-off pinch-hit home run against Wayne Granger on September 19 that gave Houston a come-from-behind 3–2 victory over the Cincinnati Reds. The home run came in Lampard's fourth Major League game, and would be the only four-base blow of his 62-game MLB career. Altogether, Lampard had 20 hits, with eight doubles and one triple, as a Major Leaguer.

Besides, Lampard was an outstanding Minor League batsman, hitting over 100 career home runs during his 1965–1973 career.

Lampard died on August 30, 2020.

Sources

External links

Keith Lampard at SABR (Baseball BioProject)
Keith Lampard at Pura Pelota (Venezuelan Professional Baseball League)

1945 births
2020 deaths
Amarillo Sonics players
Baseball players from Portland, Oregon
Cardenales de Lara players
Expatriate baseball players in Venezuela
Durham Bulls players
Eugene Emeralds players
Florida Instructional League Astros players
Florida Rookie League Astros players
Houston Astros players
Major League Baseball outfielders
Major League Baseball players from the United Kingdom
Major League Baseball players from England
English baseball players
English emigrants to the United States
Oklahoma City 89ers players
Oregon Ducks baseball players
Salisbury Astros players
Sportspeople from Warrington
Tulsa Oilers (baseball) players